Thottumukkam is a village in the district of Kozhikode, Kerala, India, under the administration of Kodiyathur Grama Panchayath on the banks of Thottumukkampuzha, a major tributary of Chaliyar. It is bordered by Karassery of Kozhikode district and Urangattiri and Kizhuparamba Grama Panchayaths of Malappuram district. Most of the people in the village are migrated farmers.

Thottumukkam including Kodiyathur Grama Panchayath is part of Thiruvambady State Assembly Constituency of Wayanad Lok Sabha Constituency. Even though Thottumukkam is part of Kozhikode district, the area belongs to the Areacode (673639) sub-post office, Thottumukkam (0483) BSNL exchange, and Kizhuparamba KSEB section office of Malappuram district.

Politics 
A native of Thottumukkam, Com. George M. Thomas is ex. Thiruvambady MLA and a CPI(M) Kozhikode DC member.

Siji Baiju (Ward 5) of CPI(M)  and Divya Shibu (Ward 6) of INC are the members of Kodiyathur Grama Panchayath Council.

Education 
 St. Thomas HSS Thottumukkam
Govt. UP School Thottumukkam
St. Thomas UP School Thottumukkam

Transportation 
Thottumukkam is connected to both Kozhikode and Malappuram district through roads. Continues and regular bus services connecting Thottumukkam to Areekode town of Malappuram, Mukkam via Parathode and Thiruvambady via Koodaranhi towns of Kozhikode.

Banks 
 Kodiyathur Service Co-operative Bank Ltd, Thottumukkam Pallithazhe
 Co-operative Urban Bank Ltd, Thottumukkam

References

Cities and towns in Kozhikode district
Thamarassery area